Jahkari Furbert (born 6 March 1999) is a Bermudan footballer who currently plays as a midfielder for Wakefield.

Career statistics

International

References

1998 births
Living people
Bermudian footballers
Bermudian expatriate footballers
Bermuda international footballers
Association football midfielders
BAA Wanderers F.C. players
Bermuda youth international footballers
Bermuda under-20 international footballers